Doris Linnea Birgitta Hedberg (later Asplund, born 18 February 1936) is a retired Swedish gymnast. She won a silver medal in the team portable apparatus event at the 1956 Summer Olympics.

References

1936 births
Living people
Swedish female artistic gymnasts
Gymnasts at the 1956 Summer Olympics
Olympic gymnasts of Sweden
Olympic silver medalists for Sweden
Olympic medalists in gymnastics
Medalists at the 1956 Summer Olympics
People from Skellefteå Municipality
Sportspeople from Västerbotten County
20th-century Swedish women